Galip Kulaksızoğlu (1889 Kadıköy, Istanbul – 1939, Istanbul) was a Turkish footballer and manager. He was among the founding line-up of the Turkish football club Fenerbahçe. He served the club for 17 years both as a player and manager. He was known for his sportsmanship and passion for the game.

Galip Kulaksızoğlu began his education in Lycée Saint-Joseph, Istanbul and graduated from this school. Football life began in this school. He was a member of the first squads of the Fenerbahçe football team which was established in Kadıköy in 1907. In the first years he was a striker. Later he was in the defense position. He scored 73 goals in 216 games. Galip Kulaksızoğlu also actively participated in tennis and hockey.

References

1939 deaths
19th-century people from the Ottoman Empire
Turkish footballers
Fenerbahçe football managers
Fenerbahçe S.K. footballers
1889 births
Association footballers not categorized by position
Turkish football managers
People from Kadıköy
Footballers from Istanbul